Maiko Bebia (born 20 May 2003) is a Georgian footballer who plays as a midfielder for the Georgia women's national team.

International career
Bebia capped for Georgia at senior level during the UEFA Women's Euro 2022 qualifying.

References

2003 births
Living people
Women's footballers from Georgia (country)
Women's association football midfielders
Georgia (country) women's international footballers